Cephalopholis polleni, the harlequin hind, harlequin grouper, harlequin cod, harlequin rockcod or blue-lined grouper, is a species of marine ray-finned fish, a grouper from the subfamily Epinephelinae which is in the family Serranidae which also includes the anthias and sea basses. This fish occurs around offshore islands in the Indo-Pacific region. It occasionally makes its way into the aquarium trade.

Description
Cephalopholis polleni has a body depth which is shorter than the length of its head, the standard length being 2.7 to 3.1 times the depth. It has a slightly truncated caudal fin and a finely serrated, rounded preopercle. The maxilla reached beyond the back of the eye. There are 9 spines in the dorsal fin and 14-16 soft rays, while the anal fin has 3 spines and 8-9 soft rays. This is a yellow to greenish-yellow grouper which is covered in bright blue stripes. They also have a yellow snout and a large black spot on both sides anterior to the nostrils. The larger juvenile, up to a standard length of  become brownish orange with horizontal purple stripes on the head and body.

Distribution
Cephalopholis polleni has a scattered distribution on offshore islands in the Indian Ocean and Western Pacific Ocean from the Comoro Islands to the Line Islands and French Polynesia. It has not been recorded from the Red Sea, the eastern African coast, Sri Lanka, continental Australia and the major islands of Indonesia. In Australia it has been recorded from Christmas Island and Cocos (Keeling) Island.

Habitat and biology
It is frequently observed in caves and under overhangs where it swims upside-down against the roofs of caves or archways. It is a solitary predatory species which feeds on smaller fishes and crustaceans.

Utilisation
Cephalopholis polleni is a rather small and rare species and is of little interest to fisheries. It occasionally enters the aquarium trade.

Taxonomy
Cephalopholis polleni was first formally described as Epinephelus polleni by the Dutch ichthyologist Pieter Bleeker (1819-1878) with the type locality given as Réunion. Its specific name honours François Pollen (1842-1888), a Dutch naturalist and merchant, who collected the type when visiting Réunion with fellow Dutch naturalist and explorer Douwe Casparus van Dam (1827-1898).

References

polleni
Fish described in 1868